Milonia Caesonia (died AD 41) was Roman empress as the fourth and last wife of the emperor Caligula from their marriage in AD 39 until they were both assassinated in 41.

Life

Early life
The daughter of Vistilia, Milonia was born toward the beginning of the first century, but the year is not certain. Her birthday was celebrated between 2 June and 4 June. Caesonius Maximus was believed by Marco Agosti to have been her father. The gens Caesonia was of modest origin, and had only recently come to prominence. David Wardle on the other hand argued that her father was likely a Milonius. Milonia had six half-brothers, five of whom are known, Servius Cornelius Scipio Orfitus (whose son, Servius Cornelius Scipio Salvidienus Orfitus, was consul in AD 51), Gnaeus Domitius Corbulo (consul in 39, and a distinguished general under Claudius and Nero, was the father of the empress Domitia Longina), Quintus Pomponius Secundus (consul suffectus in 41), Publius Pomponius Secundus (consul suffectus in 44) and Publius Suillius Rufus (consul in 43, and father of Marcus Suillius Nerullinus, consul in 50).

Marriages
Milonia was married first to a man of uncertain name, some historians have speculated that he was the Rufus mentioned to be married to a woman named Caesonia who was born on the same date as Domitian (24 October) in a poem by Martial. Marco Agosti identified him as Instanius (sometimes corrected as Instantius, Insantius, Istantius or Istanius) Rufus, a patron of Martial.

Suetonius says that when Caligula married her, she was neither beautiful nor young, and was already the mother of three daughters by her first marriage. He describes her as a woman of reckless extravagance and wantonness, whom Caligula nonetheless loved passionately and faithfully. According to Cassius Dio, the two entered into an affair some time before their marriage, either late in AD 39 or early in 40, and that the emperor's choice of a bride was an unpopular one.  The satirist Juvenal suggests that Caligula's madness was the result of a love potion administered to him by Milonia.

Milonia was pregnant at the time of the marriage, and gave birth to a daughter, Julia Drusilla, only one month later (or according to Suetonius, on her wedding day).

In the account given by Suetonius, the emperor would parade Milonia in front of his troops, and sometimes displayed her naked in front of select friends.  In an odd demonstration of affection, he would jokingly threaten to have her tortured or killed.

On 24 January, AD 41, Caligula was slain by an assassin.  As part of the wider conspiracy, Milonia and her daughter Julia Drusilla were murdered just hours after Caligula's demise.  Josephus reports that she died bravely: stricken with grief at her husband's death, she willingly offered her neck to the assassin, telling him to kill her without hesitation.

In popular culture
Milonia has been portrayed several times on film and television:
1937 – Leonora Corbett in the uncompleted film I, Claudius
1966 – Krista Keller in the TV movie Caligula
1968 – Barbara Murray in the TV series The Caesars
1975 – Yvonne Lex in the TV movie Caligula
1976 – Freda Dowie in the TV series I, Claudius
1979 – Helen Mirren in the theatrical film Caligula

References

Further reading
 Memoirs of the American Academy in Rome, Volym 40. p. 45
 Frauen um Caligula und Claudius: Milonia Caesonia, Drusilla und Messalina

External links

Coinage of Milonia Caesonia

Year of birth unknown
41 deaths
1st-century Roman empresses
Murdered Roman empresses
1st-century births
Wives of Caligula
Milonii